Matteo Cortesi (born 21 October 1997) is an Italian footballer who plays as a forward.

Club career
He made his Serie C debut for Como on 28 August 2016 in a game against Arezzo.

On 20 July 2019, he joined Giana Erminio on loan.

On 5 October 2020, he moved to Mantova.

On 25 January 2021 he signed with Swiss club Chiasso.

On 9 August 2021, he returned to Italy and joined Serie C club Seregno.

References

External links
 

1997 births
Living people
Sportspeople from the Metropolitan City of Milan
Footballers from Lombardy
Italian footballers
Association football forwards
Serie B players
Serie C players
Como 1907 players
Brescia Calcio players
A.S. Giana Erminio players
Mantova 1911 players
U.S. 1913 Seregno Calcio players
Swiss Challenge League players
FC Chiasso players
Italian expatriate footballers
Italian expatriate sportspeople in Switzerland
Expatriate footballers in Switzerland